Annalyse Lister (born 26 April 1990) is an Australian rules footballer playing for the Greater Western Sydney Giants in the AFL Women's (AFLW). Lister was drafted by GWS with their third selection and twenty-ninth overall in the 2019 AFL Women's draft. She made her debut against  at Blacktown ISP Oval in the opening round of the 2020 season.

Lister is currently studying a Master of Business Administration at Deakin University.

References

External links 

1990 births
Living people
Greater Western Sydney Giants (AFLW) players
Darebin Falcons players
Australian rules footballers from Victoria (Australia)